Kebanaran is a village in the town of Mandiraja, Banjarnegara Regency, Central Java Province, Indonesia. This village has an area of 521,69 hectares and a population of 4.549 inhabitants in 2010.

References

External link
 Banjarnegara Regency Official Website
 BPS Kabupaten Banjarnegara

Banjarnegara Regency
Villages in Central Java